K. P. Ramachandran Nair (1922-2004) was the founder of National Democratic Party and the Minister for Health from 1 September 1983 to 29 May 1985 in Kerala.

He was born on 1 January 1922 to Dr. K. P. Panikkar. He married T. Ratnamma. He died on 28 February 2004.

Political career 
K. P. Ramachandran Nair was closely associated with the activities of Nair Service Society (NSS). He was once the treasurer of the NSS  and even its director board member. Though he entered politics through Indian National Congress, he later helped to found National Democratic Party (NDP), the political arm of the NSS.

He was the Chairman of Alleppey Municipal Council from 1968-79. In 1982 Kerala State Assembly Election K. P. Ramachandran Nair defeated P. K Vasudevan Nair of Communist Party of India by a margin of 1590 votes. In 1991 Kerala State Assembly Election he won by 746 votes by defeating P.S Somasekharan of Communist Party of India. Both the times he secured victory from Alappuzha state assembly constituency. In third K Karunakaran Ministry, he assumed the office of Minister for Health from 1 September 1983 to 29 May 1985.

Electoral Performance

References 

History of Kerala (1947–present)
1922 births
2004 deaths